British Virgin Islands competed at the World Games 2017 in Wroclaw, Poland, from July 20, 2017 to July 30, 2017.

Competitors

Squash

References

Nations at the 2017 World Games
2017 in British Virgin Islands sport
British Virgin Islands at multi-sport events